Hierl is a surname. Notable people with this surname include:

 Alfred Hierl (1910–1950), German artist
 Konstantin Hierl (1875–1955), German politician
 Susanne Hierl (born 1973), German politician

Surnames of German origin